Assis Chateaubriand is a municipality in the state of Paraná in the Southern Region of Brazil.

Twin towns – sister cities

Assis Chateaubriand is twinned with:
 Seixal, Lisboa Region, Portugal

See also
List of municipalities in Paraná

References

Municipalities in Paraná